Avdella (Greek: Αβδέλλα) may refer to several places in Greece:

 Avdella, Evros, a settlement in the municipal unit of Metaxades in the Evros regional unit
 Avdella, a municipal unit in the Grevena regional unit
 Avdhela Project, an Aromanian digital library and cultural initiative named after Avdella